The Lamar Boulevard Bridge is a historic arch bridge carrying Texas State Highway Loop 343 (Lamar Boulevard) over Lady Bird Lake in downtown Austin, Texas, United States. The bridge features six open-spandrel concrete arches spanning  and carries tens of thousands of vehicles daily across the lake. Completed in 1942, the Lamar Boulevard Bridge was the second permanent bridge to cross the Colorado River (after the Ann W. Richards Congress Avenue Bridge), and one of the last Art Deco-style open-spandrel concrete arch bridges built in Texas. The bridge was named an Austin Landmark in 1993 and added to the National Register of Historic Places in 1994.

History
In the late 1930s, Austin had greatly outgrown its original town plan on the north bank of the Colorado River. In 1939, the city planned a new major north-south thoroughfare to run to the west of the Texas State Capitol and connect the city's western housing developments. This new street, eventually named Lamar Boulevard, would roughly parallel the course of Shoal Creek, reaching the river's edge near the creek's mouth. On the south bank, the boulevard would continue onward to join what was then Texas State Highway 20, leading to Fredericksburg, Texas. As the city began building the boulevard, the Texas Highway Department (now the Texas Department of Transportation) was charged with designing and building a bridge to carry Highway 20 across the river.

Construction began on March 27, 1941, and the bridge was completed and opened to traffic on July 15, 1942, at a total cost of $303,900. At that time, the bridge was left without street lights, perhaps because of material shortages relating to World War II; these were later added in 1955. The construction of Longhorn Dam in 1960 transformed the river beneath the bridge into Town Lake (now known as Lady Bird Lake), raising the water level to just below the bottoms of the arches. The view of the Texas State Capitol from the bridge became one of the Capitol View Corridors protected under state and local law from obstruction by tall buildings in 1983.

On July 7, 1994, the bridge was added to the National Register of Historic Places in recognition of its architectural significance and its continuing importance to Austin's transportation infrastructure. Today, the bridge still carries Lamar Boulevard (now designated part of Texas State Highway Loop 343) across the Colorado and supports substantial pedestrian and vehicular traffic daily; a 2011 study by the Downtown Austin Alliance asserted that the bridge now experiences more than twice the traffic volume it was designed for.

Addition of parallel pedestrian bridge

The bridge was built with no dedicated bicycle lanes and with narrow sidewalks separated from the street only by low curbs. In the 1990s, the site became notorious for road accidents involving cyclists and pedestrians. The City of Austin explored possibilities for widening the bridge to add space for non-automotive traffic, but the Texas Historical Commission opposed these proposals out of a desire to preserve the bridge's historic design.

Design

The Lamar Boulevard Bridge is an open-spandrel deck arch bridge made of poured-in-place reinforced concrete. It crosses the Colorado River with six identical  spans, supported by five concrete piers on the river bed and by concrete abutments at the ends. The deck carries four roadway lanes, flanked by a sidewalk and metal balustrade on either side. The piers (originally visible, but now largely submerged) and pedestrian guardrails show Art Deco details, such as vertical fluting, which indicate the period of the bridge's construction.

The piers stand on spread-footing foundations resting on limestone bedrock. A series of slender vertical columns rises through the open spandrels to support smaller longitudinal arches and transverse floor beams immediately beneath the deck. The floor beams cantilever roughly  beyond the piers and columns to support the sidewalks and balustrades.

The pedestrian guardrails on the approaches to the bridge are solid concrete panels, while those along the deck take the form of tubular steel railings, linked by vertical steel bars and supported by concrete columns. Eight of these  columns rise from each deck span, punctuated by taller, heavier columns above the piers, which are built to support street lights.

See also
List of crossings of the Colorado River
National Register of Historic Places listings in Travis County, Texas
List of bridges on the National Register of Historic Places in Texas

References

External links

National Register of Historic Places in Austin, Texas
Bridges completed in 1942
Bridges in Austin, Texas
City of Austin Historic Landmarks
Road bridges on the National Register of Historic Places in Texas
1942 establishments in Texas
Bridges over the Colorado River (Texas)
Concrete bridges in the United States
Open-spandrel deck arch bridges in the United States